Limnonectes tweediei (common name: Tweedie's wart frog) is a species of frogs in the family Dicroglossidae. It is found in Sumatra (Indonesia) and the Malay Peninsula (Malaysia).

Natural habitat of Limnonectes tweediei are muddy pools in rainforests near small streams and seepages. It makes holes for breeding. It is becoming rare due to pollution and habitat degradation.

References

External links
Amphibian and Reptiles of Peninsular Malaysia - Limnonectes tweediei

tweediei
Amphibians of Indonesia
Amphibians of Malaysia
Amphibians described in 1935
Taxa named by Malcolm Arthur Smith
Taxonomy articles created by Polbot